Zone 3 may refer to:

Travelcard Zone 3, of the Transport for London zonal system
Hardiness zone 3, a geographically defined zone in which a specific category of plant life is capable of growing
Zone 3 (laser tag), along with Darkzone, Megazone, and Ultrazone, a laser tag system manufactured by P&C Micros of Melbourne, Australia
Zone 3, a literary journal published at Austin Peay State University
Southeastern Atlanta
Zone 3 of Milan